Charles Pell Justice (September 13, 1913 – November 4, 1974) was an American baseball outfielder in the Negro leagues. He played with the Cleveland Giants in 1933 and the Detroit Stars in 1937.

References

External links
 and Seamheads

Akron Black Tyrites players
Detroit Stars (1937) players
1913 births
1974 deaths
Baseball players from Georgia (U.S. state)
Baseball outfielders
20th-century African-American sportspeople